The 2011 French Road Cycling Cup was the 20th edition of the French Road Cycling Cup.

The Trophée des Grimpeurs was scheduled to make a return to the calendar following its cancellation due to financial difficulties in 2010, however for the same reason as the previous year it got cancelled again. Two new events were added to the calendar, namely the Flèche d'Emeraude and the Boucles de l'Aulne.

Events

Final Overall Standings

Individual

Team

2011 French Road Cycling Cup Race Results
1. 30 January 2011 - Grand Prix d'Ouverture La Marseillaise

2. 20 March 2011 - Cholet-Pays de Loire

3. 3 April 2011 - Flèche d'Emeraude

4. 12 April 2011 - Paris–Camembert

5. 14 April 2011 - Grand Prix de Denain

6. 16 April 2011 - Tour du Finistère

7. 17 April 2011 - Tro-Bro Léon

8. 28 May 2011 - Grand Prix de Plumelec-Morbihan

9. 29 May 2011 - Boucles de l'Aulne

External links
  Coupe de France Standings

2011 in road cycling
2011
2011 in French sport